Dorstenia drakena is a plant species in the family Moraceae which is native to Mexico and Central America.

References

drakena
Plants described in 1759
Flora of Mexico
Flora of Guatemala
Flora of El Salvador
Flora of Honduras
Flora of Nicaragua
Flora of Costa Rica
Taxa named by Carl Linnaeus